The 1954–55 Duke Blue Devils men's basketball team represented Duke University in the 1954–55 NCAA Division I men's basketball season. The head coach was Harold Bradley and the team finished the season with an overall record of 20–8.

References 

Duke Blue Devils men's basketball seasons
Duke
1954 in sports in North Carolina
1955 in sports in North Carolina